Lucas Tyree Kunce (born October 6, 1982) is an American attorney and politician who is the director of national security at the American Economic Liberties Project. On March 9, 2021, he announced his campaign for the 2022 U.S. Senate election in Missouri, the day after Roy Blunt announced his retirement. He lost the Democratic primary to Trudy Busch Valentine. On January 6, 2023, he announced his campaign to run for the U.S. Senate again in the 2024 U.S. Senate Election in Missouri against Josh Hawley.

Early life and education 
Kunce was born in Hartsburg, Missouri and grew up in Jefferson City. His father worked for the Missouri Department of Conservation, while his mother retired to care for his sister, who had heart problems and underwent multiple open-heart surgeries. His family faced financial struggles as a result, eventually going bankrupt.

Kunce graduated from Jefferson City High School in 2000 as the valedictorian of his class. He went on to attend Yale University on a Pell Grant, obtaining a Bachelor of Arts degree in classical civilization. He played for the school track team and ultimate frisbee, and joined the cheerleader team in 2003 as the first male member in the current incarnation of the team. Kunce graduated from Yale in 2004, and obtained a Juris Doctor degree from the University of Missouri School of Law. He was admitted to the Missouri Bar on September 12, 2007. In 2016, he received a Master of Laws degree from Columbia Law School.

Career

2006 Missouri House campaign 
In 2006, while attending law school at the University of Missouri, Kunce ran for the Missouri State House of Representatives seat for District 113. He was defeated by the Republican incumbent Mark Bruns, with Kunce earning 44% of the vote.

Military service 
In 2007, Kunce joined the United States Marine Corps and became a lawyer in the Judge Advocate division. He served a tour in Iraq and two tours in Afghanistan. After returning to the United States, he served as the International Negotiations Officer on the Joint Staff of the Pentagon, where he represented the U.S. in arms negotiations with Russia and NATO. He joined the Council on Foreign Relations in June 2017. In 2019 he wrote an opinion article for The New York Times.

Kunce left active duty in 2020 with the rank of major, joining the American Economic Liberties Project as director of national security in August. He continues to serve in the United States Marine Corps Reserve.

2022 U.S. Senate campaign 

Kunce announced his run for the open U.S. Senate seat on March 9, 2021, the day after incumbent Republican Senator Roy Blunt announced he would not be seeking re-election in 2022. His candidacy received endorsements from the League of Conservation Voters, Progressive Change Campaign Committee and VoteVets. As of December 31, 2021, Kunce had raised $2.48 million, the most of all the candidates for the U.S. Senate seat in Missouri. He says that he does not accept corporate campaign donations. Throughout his campaign, he has emphasized his outsider status, advertising both his lack of political experience and poorer upbringing.

Kunce has received criticism for sparsely voting in Missouri elections, and also qualifying for a Washington, D.C. tax credit for a "primary residence" home in the city, which he has said he will not be accepting.

In March 2022, Kunce reported that his campaign's Independence, MO office was burglarized, with "tens of thousands of dollars worth of equipment and other resources" reported missing. In July 2022, Kunce's campaign mailed a cease-and-desist letter to primary opponent Trudy Busch Valentine for allegedly airing advertisements "containing these deliberate lies with actual malice toward Mr. Kunce in an effort to deceive Missouri voters." The Valentine campaign responded with a cease-and-desist letter to him.

Kunce lost the Democratic primary by a margin of 5% to Anheuser-Busch heiress Trudy Busch Valentine on August 2nd, 2022. He later endorsed Busch Valentine and campaigned on her behalf.

2024 U.S. Senate campaign 

On January 6, 2023, Kunce announced his second run for U.S. Senate in a bid to unseat one-term incumbent Josh Hawley. In February 2023, he was accused by the National Republican Senate Committee of faking a southern accent.

Political positions 
Kunce is described as a progressive politician. He has called his economic proposals collectively a "Marshall Plan for the Midwest," which would aim to reshore manufacturing jobs as well as reduce funding of foreign military interventions in favor of domestic infrastructure and industry investment. He has voiced his support for "repealing or revising" Section 230. Kunce has said that he would have voted for the John Lewis Voting Rights Act and For the People Act. He supports public Social Security. He opposes the death penalty.

Abortion 
Kunce supports abortion rights. He previously opposed abortion in his 2006 political campaign but he changed his opinion after spending time in Afghanistan and Iraq. In June 2022, he voiced his support for federally enshrining access to abortion in the United States constitution after the overturning of Roe v. Wade. Later, he suggested that the Democrat-majority Senate should abolish the filibuster to fedderally enshrine access to abortion in the United States constitution. Kunce supports the Women's Health Protection Act which encourages more access to abortion. He supports making abortion free under a universal health care system and wants to remove the Hyde Amendment.

LGBTQIA+ rights 
Kunce supports transgender rights. Kunce supports federally outlawing conversion therapy, and has said that he would have voted for the Equality Act. He will work towards ending the violence against transgender people in the United States. Kunce supports providing gender affirming care for youth that identify as being transgender.

During LGBTQIA+ Pride Month, Kunce attended pride parades in St. Louis, Kansas City, Missouri, and Springfield, Missouri.

Racial justice 
Kunce supports investment in Pell Grants, minority-serving institutions, and historically black colleges and universities, and advocated for a federally funded student loan forgiveness program. Kunce is a supporter of the Black Lives Matter protests. Kunce supports teaching critical race theory in schools.

Immigration 
Kunce supports immigration and says that attracting immigrants to the United States will make the country wealthier.

Gun control 
Kunce supports gun control. Kunce says he will support abolishing the filibuster to support more gun control legislation and wants more universal background checks and expanded red flag laws. Though he says it was not comprehensive enough, he has said he would have voted for the Bipartisan Safer Communities Act. He has said that the minimum age to purchase a gun should be raised to 21. He opposes the National Rifle Association.

Agriculture 
Kunce has pledged that if he is elected he will introduce legislation at the federal level that will ban foreign ownership of American agricultural land, and seize and resell land already owned by foreigners. In an opinion article for The Joplin Globe, Kunce voiced opposition to a National Animal Identification System, claiming it was written to "line the pockets of Big Ag while screwing independent farmers."

Campaign finance 
Kunce says that he does not accept corporate campaign donations. He has voiced his support for abolishing corporate PACs and requiring Congress to disclose when a piece of legislation is written by a lobbyist or special interest group. He has also voiced his support for banning members of Congress from owning stock, including blind trusts. He has also supported banning defense contractors and family members of sitting members of Congress from serving as lobbyists.

Drug policy 
Kunce has condemned the War on Drugs, citing the taxpayer cost, high number of arrests for non-violent offenses, and disproportionate impact on Black Americans. Kunce has stated he would push to legalize cannabis nationwide and reassess related convictions.

Energy and environment 
In an opinion article for The American Prospect, Kunce voiced his support for a rapid decarbonization plan costing $4.5 trillion, completely ending the use of fossil fuels in the energy and transportation sectors. He claimed that the primary motivation behind the wars in Afghanistan and Iraq was to secure the region's oil supply and that ending US reliance on fossil fuels would ultimately reduce military intervention. He also claimed the plan would help limit the impact of climate change. As a temporary means of becoming energy independent, he has suggested that he would support US oil production for use domestically. He has said that he would have voted for the Infrastructure Investment and Jobs Act.

Kunce's candidacy was endorsed by the environmental advocacy organization League of Conservation Voters.

Foreign policy 
Kunce has condemned nation-building campaigns by the US military in foreign countries, such as in Afghanistan, and has advocated reducing military funding in favor of domestic development. He has said he didn't support the basis of the 2003 invasion of Iraq, and that the US should only militarily intervene in other countries in cases of "self-defense," citing the initial stages of the invasion of Afghanistan after the September 11 attacks as an example. He has called on the US to "recruit and welcome" immigrants from all countries. He is opposed to US-based businesses offshoring manufacturing, and foreign ownership of US agricultural land.

Afghanistan 
After joining the US Marine Corps in 2007, Kunce served two tours in Afghanistan. In an interview with The American Prospect, he voiced the opinion that the US "should have left in 2002 or 2003 instead of trying to build [Afghanistan] up for 20 years." He has said the 2021 Taliban takeover of Afghanistan was "inevitable from the very beginning," and blamed defense contractors, corrupt Afghan commanders, and US politicians who "used the war to get into office" for prolonging the conflict. He has suggested that he supports the opening diplomatic relations with the Taliban.

China 
In an opinion article for The American Prospect, Kunce said he recognized China as a serious "economic challenge" and wrote they were "hacking [the US's] dedication to self-interest," citing a 1996 deal between US-based Loral Space & Communications and the Chinese state-owned Aerospace Science and Technology Corporation that quickened the development of Chinese missile equipment in violation of the Arms Export Control Act as an early example of the issue. As other examples, he cited and condemned the 2001 Chinese accession into the World Trade Organization and the 2012 acquisition of AMC Theatres by Chinese-based Wanda Group. He has said that the US is too reliant on Chinese manufacturing, and maintained the opinion that large American companies are too subservient to Chinese interests. He has condemned American universities for accepting Chinese students funded by the People's Liberation Army, saying students use their time in the US to study emerging tech and then take their research back to the PLA, but has also suggested that the US more intentionally to recruit Chinese students and workers in the US into long-term work in US-based industries and help them to become citizens.

Kunce has proposed artificially raising the cost of offshoring to China by requiring US-based businesses to reimburse the government for any public subsidies they received before offshoring, creating a targeted tax to penalize US-based businesses who offshore, and/or increasing fines for businesses who break market laws to match the amount the business gained from breaking said laws. He has also proposed forcing joint ventures for Chinese-based companies who wish to set up in the US, and federally backing loans for US-based businesses wishing to get into industries "captured" by China. The industries would include manufacturing of printed circuit boards, semiconductors, telecommunication devices and products on the solar value chain. He has expressed his support for invoking the International Emergency Economic Powers Act and Defense Production Act of 1950 to do this in some circumstances. He has said that the US military advantage on China has been "slipping away," and blamed the US's "monopoly crisis" for stifling development, citing buyout of US-based military telecommunications manufacturer Lucent and rise of Chinese state-funded telecommunications company Huawei as an example. He has condemned the consolidation and offshoring of US military-industrial manufacturing as a threat to national security, saying it can lead to kickbacks or market failure. He has suggested banning Chinese investment in US-based companies.

Russia 
In a statement following the 2022 Russian invasion of Ukraine, Kunce called Vladimir Putin a "tyrant" and condemned the invasion, as well as the previous Russian invasions of Georgia and Crimea. He has said that the US should militarily "fulfill [their] NATO obligations — that’s it" and combat the invasion by sanctioning Russian oligarchs and helping Western Europe to stop purchasing Russian gas by creating and selling them alternative renewable energy technologies.

Health care 
Kunce supports a universal health care system. He has also voiced his support for expanding access to health services for veterans, including mental health services and medical marijuana.

Kunce has condemned "abusive prices" set by insulin producers and has proposed charging companies Eli Lilly and Company, Novo Nordisk, and Sanofi with monopolization of insulin production under the Sherman Antitrust Act. He has proposed the creation of government-funded insulin production facilities in Missouri, later to be turned over to the private sector, saying "the government should fund things, not run things."

Labor rights 
Kunce has voiced his support for "the union way of life," and has said that trade unions lead to "better wages, benefits, and protections" for workers. He has advocated raising the federal minimum wage to $15/hour. He has said he would have voted for the Protecting the Right to Organize Act, and he says will push for legislation that ensures paid family, medical, and sick leave for all workers. He has said he would like to strengthen the Equal Employment Opportunity Commission. He has identified "pay discrimination against Americans with disabilities" and "workplace harassment" as key labor rights issues as well. He has implied that he would support federally mandating worker representation on corporate boards of directors.

In Kunce's 2006 Missouri House campaign, he received $650 in donations from local union chapters. In 2019, he wrote an opinion article for The New York Times voicing his opposition to Google and Microsoft workers who protested the sale of their products to the military, saying that if tech companies "work with the military, then technologies from applications of A.I. to augmented reality would save innocent lives and reduce suffering," and voicing the opinion that workers would be better off protesting the war in Afghanistan directly. In 2021, he visited a drive in favor of Amazon worker organization in Bessemer, Alabama. In 2022, he visited drives for Starbucks unions as well as the International Brotherhood of Electrical Workers in Missouri.

Personal life 
Kunce currently resides in Independence, Missouri, and owns a home in Washington, D.C. where he lived while working as a Marine.  Kunce is an  Episcopalian and a member of the Grace Episcopal Church. He is bilingual, speaking Pashto in addition to English. In February 2023, Kunce married National Resource Defense Council analyst Marilyn Martinez. He has two sons from his first marriage.

See also 
2024 United States Senate election in Missouri
2022 United States Senate election in Missouri
2022 Missouri elections

References

External links 
Senate Campaign website

1982 births
Candidates in the 2022 United States Senate elections
Columbia Law School alumni
Living people
Missouri Democrats
Missouri lawyers
People from Boone County, Missouri
People from Jefferson City, Missouri
United States Marine Corps Judge Advocate Division
United States Marine Corps officers
United States Marine Corps reservists
University of Missouri School of Law alumni
Yale College alumni
Candidates in the 2024 United States Senate elections